Lansing River Trail is a multiple use trail approximately  long. It runs along the Grand River and the Red Cedar River between Michigan State University and Dietrich Park in northern Lansing. The first segment of trail opened in 1975. It was designated a National Recreation Trail in 1981.

The trail has a western extension that begins where it splits off at River Point park just south of downtown Lansing and ends in Moores Park. The River Trail South stretches along Sycamore Creek from Potter Park to Maguire Park in southeast Lansing. The stretch from Hawk Island County Park to Maguire Park was completed in 2008.

The River Trail is also home to a number of special events, including the Common Ground Music Festival, the Annual Mayor's Walk, Michigan Run, the  Capital City River Run and a number of other city-sponsored activities.

The trail is currently being extended into Delhi Township to connect with an existing trail in Holt, as well as east to west across south Lansing.

References

External links
 Lansing River Trail dot Org's Current Map - Up to date, clear and concise map.
 Map of the trail - Map of the Lansing River Trail with information about scenic spots along the trail.
 Heart of Michigan Trail - Lansing River Trail is a part of this bigger trail.
 OpenStreetMap - The Lansing River Trail on OpenStreetMap.

East Lansing, Michigan
Protected areas of Ingham County, Michigan
Tourist attractions in Lansing, Michigan
Transportation in Lansing, Michigan
Geography of Lansing, Michigan
Bike paths in Michigan
National Recreation Trails in Michigan
Transportation in Ingham County, Michigan
Protected areas established in 1975
1975 establishments in Michigan